The Insular Government of the Philippine Islands was an unincorporated territory of the United States that was established in 1902 and was reorganized in 1935 in preparation for later independence. The Insular Government was preceded by the United States Military Government of the Philippine Islands and was followed by the Commonwealth of the Philippines.

The Philippines were acquired from Spain by the United States in 1898 following the Spanish–American War. Resistance led to the Philippine–American War, in which the United States suppressed the nascent First Philippine Republic. In 1902, the United States Congress passed the Philippine Organic Act, which organized the government and served as its basic law. This act provided for a governor-general appointed by the president of the United States, as well as a bicameral Philippine Legislature with the appointed Philippine Commission as the upper house and a fully elected, fully Filipino elected lower house, the Philippine Assembly. The Internal Revenue Law of 1904 provided for general internal revenue taxes, documentary taxes and transfer of livestock. A wide variety of Revenue stamps were issued in denominations ranging from one centavo to 20,000 pesos.

The term "insular" refers to the fact that the government operated under the authority of the U.S. Bureau of Insular Affairs. Puerto Rico and Guam also had insular governments at this time. From 1901 to 1922, the U.S. Supreme Court wrestled with the constitutional status of these governments in the Insular Cases. In Dorr v. United States (1904), the court ruled that Filipinos did not have a constitutional right to trial by jury. In the Philippines itself, the term "insular" had limited usage. On banknotes, postage stamps, and the coat of arms, the government referred to itself simply as the "Philippine Islands".

The 1902 Philippine Organic Act was replaced in 1916 by the Jones Law, which ended the Philippine Commission and provided for both houses of the Philippine Legislature to be elected. In 1935, the Insular Government was replaced by the Commonwealth. Commonwealth status was intended to last ten years, during which the country would be prepared for independence.

History

The Insular Government evolved from the Taft Commission, or Second Philippine Commission, appointed on March 16, 1900. This group was headed by William Howard Taft, and was granted legislative powers by President William McKinley in September 1900. The commission created a judicial system, an educational system, a civil service, and a legal code. The legality of these actions was contested until the passage of the Spooner Amendment in 1901, which granted the U.S. president authority to govern the Philippines.

The Insular Government saw its mission as one of tutelage, preparing the Philippines for eventual independence. On July 4, 1901, Taft was appointed "civil governor", who also named his cabinet at his inaugural address. Military Governor Adna Chaffee retained authority in disturbed areas. On July 4, 1902, the office of military governor was abolished, and Taft became the first U.S. governor-general of the Philippine Islands.

The Philippine Organic Act disestablished the Catholic Church as the state religion. Despite this, the Insular Government failed to investigate the land titles of the friars' and restore them to the patrimony of the Filipinos. The Insular Government then established a land titling system for these lands, but due to a small surveyor staff, a lot of parcels of land remained untitled.

Two years after the completion and publication of a census, a general election was conducted for the choice of delegates to a popular assembly. An elected Philippine Assembly was convened in 1907 as the lower house of a bicameral legislature, with the Philippine Commission as the upper house. The 1909 U.S. Payne–Aldrich Tariff Act provided for free trade with the Philippines. Every year from 1907, the Philippine Assembly (and later the Philippine Legislature) passed resolutions expressing the Filipino desire for independence.

Jones Law
Philippine nationalists led by Manuel L. Quezon and Sergio Osmeña enthusiastically endorsed the draft Jones Bill of 1912, which provided for Philippine independence after eight years, but later changed their views, opting for a bill which focused less on time than on the conditions of independence. The nationalists demanded complete and absolute independence to be guaranteed by the United States, since they feared that too-rapid independence from American rule without such guarantees might cause the Philippines to fall into Japanese hands. The Jones Bill was rewritten and passed a Congress controlled by Democrats in 1916 with a later date of independence. The Democratic party in the United States had strongly opposed acquisitions of the Philippines in the first place, and increasingly became committed to independence. The election of Democrat Woodrow Wilson, who advocated a constitutional government in the Philippines as a step towards independence, in 1912 opened up the opportunity. He appointed Francis Burton Harrison as governor, and Harrison replaced mainlanders with Filipinos in the bureaucracy. At his departure in 1921, of the 13,757 government bureaucrats, 13,143 were Filipinos; they occupied 56 of the top 69 positions. 

The Jones Law, or Philippine Autonomy Act, replaced the Organic Act. Its preamble stated that the eventual independence of the Philippines would be American policy, subject to the establishment of a stable government. The law maintained an appointed governor-general, but established a bicameral Philippine Legislature to replace the elected Philippine Assembly (lower house); it replaced the appointive Philippine Commission (upper house) with an elected senate.

Filipino activists suspended the independence campaign during the First World War and supported the United States and the Allies of World War I against the German Empire. After the war they resumed their independence drive with great vigour. On March 17, 1919, the Philippine Legislature passed a "Declaration of Purposes", which stated the inflexible desire of the Filipino people to be free and sovereign. A Commission of Independence was created to study ways and means of attaining liberation ideal. This commission recommended the sending of an independence mission to the United States. The "Declaration of Purposes" referred to the Jones Law as a veritable pact, or covenant, between the American and Filipino peoples whereby the United States promised to recognize the independence of the Philippines as soon as a stable government should be established. American Governor-General Harrison had concurred in the report of the Philippine Legislature as to a stable government.

The Philippine Legislature funded an independence mission to the United States in 1919. The mission departed Manila on February 28 and met in America with and presented their case to Secretary of War Newton D. Baker. U.S. President Woodrow Wilson, in his 1921 farewell message to Congress, certified that the Filipino people had performed the condition imposed on them as a prerequisite to independence, declaring that, this having been done, the duty of the U.S. is to grant Philippine independence. Neither Congress nor Warren G. Harding, Wilson's successor as president, acted on Wilson's recommendation. In 1921, President Harding sent William Cameron Forbes and Leonard Wood as heads of the Wood-Forbes Commission to investigate conditions in the Philippines. The Commission concluded that Filipinos were not yet ready for independence from the United States, a finding that was widely criticized in the Philippines.

Road to Commonwealth status
After the first independence mission, public funding of such missions was ruled illegal. Subsequent independence missions in 1922, 1923, 1930, 1931 1932, and two missions in 1933 were funded by voluntary contributions. Numerous independence bills were submitted to the U.S. Congress, which passed the Hare–Hawes–Cutting Bill on December 30, 1932. U.S. President Herbert Hoover vetoed the bill on January 13, 1933. Congress overrode the veto on January 17, and the Hare–Hawes–Cutting Act became U.S. law. The law promised Philippine independence after 10 years, but reserved several military and naval bases for the United States, as well as imposing tariffs and quotas on Philippine exports. The law also required the Philippine Senate to ratify the law. Quezon urged the Philippine Senate to reject the bill, which it did. Quezon himself led the twelfth independence mission to Washington to secure a better independence act. The result was the Tydings–McDuffie Act of 1934 which was very similar to the Hare–Hawes–Cutting Act except in minor details. The Tydings–McDuffie Act was ratified by the Philippine Senate. The law provided for the granting of Philippine independence by 1946.

The Tydings–McDuffie Act provided for the drafting and guidelines of a constitution for a ten-year "transitional period" as the Commonwealth of the Philippines before the granting of Philippine independence. On May 5, 1934, the Philippines Legislature passed an act setting the election of convention delegates. Governor-General Frank Murphy designated July 10 as the election date, and the Convention held its inaugural session on July 30. The completed draft Constitution was approved by the Convention on February 8, 1935, approved by U.S. President Franklin Roosevelt on March 23, and ratified by popular vote on May 14. The first election under the new 1935 constitution was held on September 17, and on November 15, 1935 the Commonwealth was established.

Governor-general

On July 4, 1901, executive authority over the islands was transferred to the president of the Philippine Commission, who had the title of "civil governor"–a position appointed by the President of the United States and approved by the United States Senate. For the first year a military governor, Adna Chaffee, ruled parts of the country still resisting American rule, concurrent with civil governor William Howard Taft. Disagreements between the two were not uncommon. The following year, on July 4, 1902, the civil governor became the sole executive authority of the islands. Chaffee remained as Commander of the Philippine Division until September 30, 1902.

The title was changed to "Governor-General" in 1905 by Act of Congress (Public 43 – February 6, 1905).

Governor Harrison

Francis Burton Harrison was Governor-General from 1913 to 1921 under President Woodrow Wilson, a Democrat. He advocated for and oversaw the process of Filipinization, or the transfer of authority to Filipinos in the United States territory's Insular Government to better prepare for independence. He was governor-general during the passages of the Philippine Autonomy Act, otherwise known as the Jones Act, which converted the partially elected Philippine Legislature with the appointed Philippine Commission as the upper house and the elected Philippine Assembly as the lower house, to a fully elected Philippine Legislature with the Philippine Senate replacing the now-dissolved Philippine Commission and the Philippine Assembly renamed the House of Representatives of the Philippines.

Despite the length of his tenure as governor-general he vetoed only five bills, the least number by any American governor-general in the Philippines. His pro-Filipino stance made him a popular figure in the Philippines but also the object of criticism of conservative Americans who viewed his liberal governance as not supportive enough of U.S. interests.

Under his administration, the Governor-General's Spanish-era mansion called Malacañan Palace was expanded with the construction of an executive building. When he left the Philippines, Harrison lived in Scotland until being recalled to the Philippines in 1934 during a period of transition from an unincorporated territory of the United States to the Commonwealth of the Philippines.

In 1921, Republican President Warren G. Harding sent William Cameron Forbes and Leonard Wood as heads of the Wood-Forbes Commission to investigate conditions in the Philippines. The Commission concluded that Filipinos were not yet ready for independence from the United States, a finding that was widely criticized in the Philippines.

On November 15, 1935, the Commonwealth government was inaugurated. The office of President of the Philippines was created to replace the Governor-General as Chief Executive, taking over many of the former's duties. The American Governor-General then became known as the High Commissioner to the Philippines.

Resident commissioners

From the passage of the Organic Act until independence, the Philippine Islands were represented in the United States House of Representatives by two, and then one, resident commissioners of the Philippines. Similar to delegates and the Resident Commissioner of Puerto Rico, they were nonvoting members of Congress.

See also
 History of the Philippines (1898–1946)
 United States Military Government of the Philippine Islands
 First Philippine Republic
 Second Philippine Republic
 Commonwealth of the Philippines

References

Bibliography

 Brands, H. W. Bound to Empire: The United States and the Philippines (1992) excerpt
 
 
 
 
 
 Morison, Elting E.  Turmoil and Tradition: A Study of the Life and Times of Henry L. Stimson. (1960) pp 280-298. online
 
 
 
 Smith, Tony. America's mission call in the United States and the worldwide struggle for democracy in the twentieth century (1994) pp 37-59.
 Stimson, Henry L. and McGeorge Bundy.  On Active Services in Peace and War. (1948) pp 117-154. online

Further reading

Notes 

 
Philippine Islands
1901 establishments in the Philippines
1935 disestablishments in the Philippines
Former countries of the interwar period
Philippines–United States military relations
Presidency of Theodore Roosevelt
Presidency of William Howard Taft
Presidency of Woodrow Wilson
Presidency of Warren G. Harding
Presidency of Calvin Coolidge
Presidency of Herbert Hoover
Presidency of Franklin D. Roosevelt